Shahmar Zulfugar oglu Alakbarov (23 August 1943 – 12 August 1992)  was an Azerbaijani actor and film director.

Career
Shahmar Alakbarov was born in Ganja, Azerbaijan, to Zulfugar Alakbarov who was from Cəbrayil and Izulat khanum who was from Tbilisi. He is known for Qatir Mammad (1974), Bakida külaklar asir (1974) and Alava iz (1981). Shahmar Alakbarov has begun his career by performing in Lupe de Vega and William Shakespeare in theater. His first film was Dağlarda döyüş and last film was Yük(1995). The scenario of Yük belonged to Shahmar Alakbarov, but he could not see this film.

Shahmar Alakbarov also performed as a radio broadcaster, and his first radio broadcasting was "Ulduz". After that he began to work in "Mоlla Nəsrəddin" radio as a broadcaster. Shahmar Alakbarov always wanted to shoot a film. The first time he examined himself as a director in Imtahan film together with Gulbaniz Azimzadeh. Then, he shot Sahilsiz gecə, his success and popularity were spreading. Shahmar Alakbarov was getting close to reaching his peak in this field. The film of Qəzəlxan was his third and one of the most beloved films.

While shooting the film Shahmar's health was getting worse. He could not see this film on the screen like the film of Yük which he gave its scenario. He died from tongue cancer in 1992, on 12 August. Shahmar Alakbarov got the name both of People's Artist and Honored Artist, and received the Laureate of State Price of Azerbaijan USSR.

References

1943 births
1992 deaths
20th-century Azerbaijani male actors
Azerbaijani screenwriters
Actors from Ganja, Azerbaijan
20th-century screenwriters
Burials at II Alley of Honor